Wellsburg Wharf is a historic wharf located at Wellsburg, Brooke County, West Virginia. The public wharf was built in 1836. The site consists of remains of the wharf and the foundations of two warehouses. The wharf remains consist of cobblestones along the riverbank.  One of the warehouses was built by Danforth Brown.

It was listed on the National Register of Historic Places in 1979.

References

Transportation buildings and structures on the National Register of Historic Places in West Virginia
Transport infrastructure completed in 1836
Buildings and structures in Brooke County, West Virginia
National Register of Historic Places in Brooke County, West Virginia
Wharves in the United States
Wharves on the National Register of Historic Places